Visual Nature Studio is a 3D visualization program for Microsoft Windows, developed as an enhanced version of 3D Nature's "World Construction Set" software.  The program produces photorealistic still images or animations of fictional or real landscapes by using digital elevation model (DEM) and geographic information system (GIS) data as input. Considered state-of-the-art, the software has been used by major universities and press agencies to generate images of 3D terrain.

In late 2015, Visual Nature Studio was acquired along with all of 3D Nature's other assets by AlphaPixel LLC, another company founded by 3D Nature co-founder Chris 'Xenon' Hanson. AlphaPixel continues to sell and support Visual Nature Studio commercially under the 3D Nature brand but has also released the source code under the OSGPL (a variant of the LGPL) to ensure the software cannot be lost in the future and protect the investment of its users.

References 
3D Nature homepage
Company History
 Stephen M. Ervin, Hope H. Hasbrouck. Landscape Modeling: Digital Techniques for Landscape Visualization, p91, 179, 200, 236, 237. McGraw-Hill, 2001. 
 "Alternatives for Coastal Development: One Site, Three Scenarios", NOAA project description
 "Research: Visualization & Emerging Technologies", March 17, 2006, Penn State University
 "Destination: Manhattan, 1609", May 2005, p. 44, Wired magazine
 "3D Nature’s World Construction Set 6", August 1, 2003, Animation Magazine review
 Faculty of Forestry, Université de Moncton (Edmundston)

External links
Website featuring samples, tutorials and downloadable content
 "2004 VISUALIZATION CHALLENGE: Informational Graphics", 2004, National Geographic (used World Construction Set software)

3D graphics software
GIS software